Dicerothamnus is a genus of flowering plants belonging to the family Asteraceae.

Its native range is South African Republic.

Species:

Dicerothamnus adpressus 
Dicerothamnus rhinocerotis

References

Gnaphalieae
Asteraceae genera